Los Jerónimos is an administrative neighborhood (barrio) of Madrid belonging to the district of Retiro. It is 1.900627 km² in size. The Retiro Park, the Town Hall and the Prado Museum are located within its limits.

References 

Wards of Madrid
Retiro (Madrid)